Yvette is female given name, the French feminine form of Yves, which means yew or archer in some cases.

Name days 
Czech Republic: 7 June
Hungary: 13 January, 6 May and 29 June
Poland: 13 January
Slovakia: 27 May
Bulgaria: 24 June ("Eniovden") 
Latvia: 12 December

Notable people 
Yvette Alexander (born 1961), U.S. politician
Yvette Andréyor (1891–1962), French silent film actress
Yvette Baker (born 1968), British orienteer
Yvette Biro, Hungarian essayist, screenwriter, and professor emerita
Yvetta Blanarovičová, Slovak actress and singer
Yvette Borup Andrews (1891–1959), American photographer 
Yvette Brind'Amour (1918–1992), Canadian actor
Yvette Cason, U.S. film and television actress
Yvette Chauviré (1917–2016), French prima ballerina
Yvette Clarke (born 1964), U.S. politician
Yvette Cooper (born 1969), British politician
Yvette Coppersmith (born 1980), Australian artist
Yvette D'Ath (born 1970), Australian politician
Yvette Devereaux, U.S. conductor
Yvette Caver, U.S. Author 
Yvette Espinosa (1911–1992), English ballerina and ballet teacher
Yvette Estermann (born 1967), Swiss politician
Yvette Fielding (born 1968), British broadcaster and actress
Yvette Flores, U.S. child actress for the Kidsongs videos and TV show
Yvette Flunder (born 1955), U.S. bishop and singer
Yvette Freeman (born 1957), U.S. actress
Yvette Giraud (1916–2014), French singer
Yvette Girouard, U.S. softball coach
Yvette Guilbert (1867–1944), French cabaret singer and actress
Yvette Higgins (born 1978), Australian waterpolo player
Yvetta Hlaváčová (born 1975), Czech swimmer
Yvette Jarvis, U.S./Greek athlete, politician, actress and model
Yvette Kane (born 1953), U.S. judge
Yvette Kong (born 1993), Hong Kong competitive Olympic swimmer
Yvette Lee Bowser (born 1965), U.S. television writer and producer
Yvette Lu, Canadian independent film and stage actress, singer, composer, writer and producer
Yvette Michele (born 1972), U.S. R&B singer
Yvette Mimieux (born 1942), U.S. film and television actress
Yvette Nicole Brown (born 1971), U.S. actress
Yvette Nipar (born 1964), American actress
Yvette of Huy (1158–1228), Christian prophetess and anchoress
Yvette Rekangali, Gabonese politician
Yvette Roudy (born 1929), French politician
Yvette Sylvander, one half of Swedish cover model twins Yvette and Yvonne Sylvander
Yvette Tollar, Canadian jazz vocalist
Yvette Vickers (1928–2010s), U.S. actress, pin-up model and singer
Yvette Williams (1929–2019), New Zealand athlete
Yvette Wilson (1964–2012), U.S. comedian and actress
Yvette Young, American musician

Fictional characters
Yvette Carte-Blanche, a fictional character in the British comedy series ''Allo 'Allo!
Yvette, the codename of the fictional organiser of the Belgian escape organisation for allied bomber pilots, Lifeline, in the BBC television series Secret Army
Yvette Saywell, the protagonist of D.H. Lawrence's The Virgin and the Gipsy
Yvette, the maid and secondary character in the movie Clue
Yvette, one of the main six Groovy Girls, a doll series manufactured by Manhattan Toy
Yvette Gabriella Montilyet, Josephine's younger sister in Dragon Age Inquisition.
Yvette Samoris by Guy De Maupassant
Yvette Woodgrove, supporting character in Futari wa Pretty Cure (originally named Yoshimi Takenouchi)

See also 
 

Feminine given names
French feminine given names
English feminine given names
Given names derived from plants or flowers
Slovak feminine given names
Dutch feminine given names